Agriocnemis exilis is a species of damselfly in the family Coenagrionidae. It is found in Angola, Botswana, Burkina Faso, Cameroon, Central African Republic, Chad, Ivory Coast, Egypt, Ethiopia, Gambia, Ghana, Guinea, Kenya, Liberia, Madagascar, Malawi, Mauritius, Mozambique, Namibia, Nigeria, Réunion, Senegal, Sierra Leone, Somalia, South Africa, Tanzania, Togo, Uganda, Zambia, Zimbabwe, and possibly Burundi.

References

Coenagrionidae
Insects described in 1872
Taxonomy articles created by Polbot